Sunderland Bay is a small town on Phillip Island in Victoria, Australia.

Notes and references

Phillip Island
Towns in Victoria (Australia)
Bass Coast Shire